Hericium abietis, commonly known as the bear's head or the western coral hedgehog, is an edible mushroom in the tooth fungus group. It fruits from after the start of the fall rains to mid-season.

Taxonomy
The species was first described as Hydnum abietis by American botanist James Robert Weir in 1931. Weir collected the type specimens in 1916, near the Priest River in Idaho. Kenneth Archibald Harrison transferred it to the genus Hericium in 1964. The mushroom is commonly known as the "bear's head" or the "western coral hedgehog".

Description

The fruit body forms a compact, branched mass with long spines hanging down. The branches originate from a single, thick, tough base. The color of the fruit body ranges from white to creamy, light yellowish, to salmon-buff.

Hericium abietis produces a white spore print. The spores are spherical or nearly so, smooth to slightly roughened, amyloid, and measure 4.5–5.5 by 4–5 μm. The hyphae are monomitic (consisting of only generative hyphae), and they have clamp connections.

Similar species
Hericium erinaceus is a lookalike spine fungus. It can be distinguished by its more compact fruit body structure that lacks multiple branches, in which the hanging spines all originate from a single thick tubercle. In Hericium coralloides, the spines line the undersides of the branches, unlike H. abietis, whose spines are arranged in clusters at the tip of branches.

Edibility
Hericium abietis is edible and choice. David Arora suggests that cooking the mushroom produces a flavor similar to fish, and that it is suitable for sauteing, marinating, or preparing as a curry dish.

Habitat and distribution
Hericium abietis causes a white rot of conifers; this is a form of wood decay featuring a selective attack on lignin and hemicellulose in wood. The fruit bodies grow singly or occasionally in small groups on the dead wood of conifers, especially  Douglas fir. It can also be cultivated on conifer sawdust or logs. The species is found throughout North America.

References

External links
 

Hericium abietis at mykoweb.com

Russulales
Edible fungi
Fungi described in 1931
Fungi of North America